Kansas City-style barbecue refers to the specific regional barbecue style of slowly smoked meat originating from Kansas City in the early 20th century. Henry Perry is credited as the originator of the style, as two of the oldest Kansas City-style barbecue restaurants still in operation trace their roots back to Perry's pit. The Kansas City-style sauce is characterized by a thick, sweet sauce derived from brown sugar, molasses, and tomatoes.

Characteristics 
Kansas City barbecue is characterized by its use of a wide variety of meats: pork, beef, chicken, turkey, lamb, sausage, and sometimes even fish.

Kansas City barbecue is seasoned with a dry rub, slow-smoked over a variety of woods and served with a thick tomato-based barbecue sauce, which is an integral part of Kansas City style. Most local restaurants and sauce companies offer several varieties with spicy and tangy flavor profiles, historically the sauces were not sweet until Rich Davis, a child psychatrist from KC developed the KC Masterpiece sauce which used molasses and varied greatly from the more traditional sauces used at the longtime KC BBQ restaurants where orders are made at a counter. 

Most types of barbecued meat served in other American cities known for barbecue, including pulled pork, brisket, beef ribs, chicken, and pork ribs in a number of different cuts, are served in Kansas City-area barbecue restaurants. 

Burnt ends—the crusty, fatty, flavorful meat cut from the point of a smoked beef brisket—are among the items prepared.

Side dishes served with Kansas City barbecue include a unique style of baked beans, French fries, coleslaw, and other classic barbeque side dishes.

History
The Kansas City metropolitan area has more than 100 barbecue restaurants, a number of which are nationally renowned. The area is also home to several large barbecue cooking contests, notably the Great Lenexa BBQ Battle and the American Royal World Series of Barbecue, the largest barbecue competition in the world.

Henry Perry
Kansas City traces its barbecue history to Henry Perry, who operated out of a trolley barn at 19th and Highland in the legendary African-American neighborhood around 18th and Vine.

Perry served slow-cooked ribs on pages of newsprint for 25 cents a slab. Perry came from Shelby County, Tennessee, near Memphis, and began serving barbecue in 1908. Kansas City and Memphis barbecue styles are somewhat similar, although Kansas City tends to use more sauce and a wider variety of meats. Perry's sauce had a somewhat harsh, peppery flavor.

Perry's restaurant became a major cultural point during the heyday of Kansas City Jazz during the "wide-open" days of Tom Pendergast in the 1920s and 1930s.

Arthur Bryant

Working for Henry Perry was Charlie Bryant, who in turn brought his brother, Arthur Bryant, into the business. Charlie took over the Perry restaurant in 1940 after Perry died. Arthur then took over his brother's business in 1946, and the restaurant was renamed Arthur Bryant's.

Arthur Bryant's, which eventually moved to 1727 Brooklyn in the same neighborhood, became a stomping ground for baseball fans and players in the 1950s and 1960s, because of its close proximity to Municipal Stadium, where the Kansas City Athletics or A's played their home games during that period.

In April 1972, Kansas City native Calvin Trillin wrote an article in Playboy proclaiming Bryant's to be the best restaurant on the planet.

Despite new-found fame, Bryant did not change the restaurant's very simple decor, which consisted of fluorescent lighting, formica tables, and five-gallon jars of sauce displayed in the windows, even as Presidents Harry Truman, Jimmy Carter and Ronald Reagan stopped by.

Bryant died of a heart attack, in a bed that he kept at the restaurant, shortly after Christmas of 1982. The restaurant is still open. The sauce and restaurant continue their success.

Along the main inner wall of the restaurant is photographic history of many famous politicians, actors, actresses and sports figures and other tribute pictures of military personnel displaying Arthur Bryant's memorabilia such as shirts or bottles of sauce.

Gates and Sons
In 1946 Arthur Pinkard, who was a cook for Perry, joined with George Gates to form Gates and Sons Bar-B-Q. The restaurant was situated initially in the same neighborhood.

Gates barbecue sauce does not contain molasses; the ingredients, as listed on the bottle, are: "Tomatoes, vinegar, salt, sugar, celery, garlic, spices, and pepper. 1/10 of 1% potassium sorbate preservative added." It is available in Original Classic, Mild, Sweet & Mild, and Extra Hot varieties.

Gates also expanded its footprint in a more conventional way, with restaurants all displaying certain common features—red-roofed buildings, a recognizable logo (a strutting man clad in tuxedo and top hat) and the customary "Hi, may I help you?" greeting belted out by its employees as patrons enter.

Gates has opened restaurants throughout the Kansas City metropolitan area. The chain currently consists of six area restaurants: four in Missouri, two in Kansas. Gates also has sold barbecue sandwiches at Kauffman Stadium during Kansas City Royals home games, and currently at Arrowhead Stadium during Kansas City Chiefs home games.

Other notable restaurants

Fiorella's Jack Stack Barbecue
Fiorella's Jack Stack Barbecue had its beginnings as the second restaurant in the Smokestack BBQ chain, which Russ Fiorella, Sr. had started in 1957. Fiorella's eldest son Jack worked with his father until 1974, when he and his wife Delores opened their own Smokestack location in the Martin City neighborhood of south Kansas City.

Eventually Jack, along with his wife and children, decided to expand their menu selections, adding non-traditional barbecue menu items like hickory-grilled steaks, lamb ribs, crown prime beef ribs, and fresh, hickory-grilled seafood, along with an extensive wine and bar selection. 

They also began offering a higher level of comfort and service than most people were accustomed to at a barbecue restaurant. Smokestack BBQ in Martin City soon became one of the most successful restaurants in the Kansas City metro. In 1996, Jack Fiorella was named Restaurateur of the Year by the Greater Kansas City Restaurant Association.

By the mid-1990s, Jack Fiorella decided to replicate the success of his Martin City Smokestack restaurant. 

Other members of the Fiorella family told Jack that he was not permitted to use the Smokestack name for his new restaurant, so both the new restaurant (opened in 1997 in Overland Park, Kansas) and Jack's existing restaurant in Martin City dropped the Smokestack name and were rebranded as Fiorella's Jack Stack Barbecue. They also opened a full-service catering operation in Martin City and their third location in the historic Freight House building in the Crossroads Arts District. 

They began shipping their barbecue nationwide in 2000, and in October 2006 they opened a fourth location on The Country Club Plaza. In 2014, a fifth Jack Stack restaurant opened in Lee's Summit, Missouri. 

The original Smokestack chain closed its last remaining location in 2012.

Fiorella's Jack Stack Barbecue has been featured on The Food Network and The History Channel, and has been rated as among the best barbecue in the United States by several national organizations and magazines. Most notably, the Zagat Survey has named it the "#1 Barbecue House in the Country."

Joe's Kansas City

Joe’s Kansas City Bar-B-Que can be traced to competition barbecue and the Kansas City Barbeque Society (KCBS). Accompanying friends at the American Royal and The Great Lenexa BBQ Battle inspired Jeff Stehney to start cooking on his own. The first smoker purchased was an Oklahoma Joe’s 24” smoker, christened in April 1991.

By 1993, Jeff, his wife and business partner Joy, and Jim "Thurston" Howell were ready to make their mark on the KCBS competition circuit. Their competition team, Slaughterhouse Five, ended up winning eight Grand Championships, including the prestigious American Royal BBQ, three Reserve Grand Championships, and the KCBS’s Grand Champion “Team of the Year” in 1993. Over the next several seasons Slaughterhouse Five won dozens more awards and was generally recognized as one of the top competition BBQ teams in the Country.

Jeff and Joy opened Oklahoma Joe's Bar-B-Que (later renamed to Joe’s Kansas City Bar-B-Que) in a gas station in Kansas City, Kansas in 1996. There are also locations in Olathe, Kansas and Leawood, Kansas.

Celebrity chef Anthony Bourdain listed Joe's original Kansas City, Kansas location as one of "13 Places You Must Eat Before You Die". Men's Health magazine named it America's manliest restaurant. Joe's was featured on Season 3 of Man v. Food in August 2010. It was also named "Kansas City's Best Barbecue" by Zagat.

KC Masterpiece
In 1977, Rich Davis capitalized on the reputation of Kansas City barbecue to form KC Masterpiece, which evolved from his "K.C. Soul Style Barbecue Sauce". KC Masterpiece is sweeter and thicker than many of the traditional Kansas City sauces served in the region. The KC Masterpiece recipe uses extra molasses to achieve its thick, sweet character.

KC Masterpiece was sold to Kingsford charcoal in 1986 and now claims to be the number-one premium barbecue brand in the U.S. When Davis sold the rights to his sauce to Kingsford, he announced plans to build a franchise of barbecue restaurants. 

The franchises were successful for a few years, but have since all closed.

Curt's Famous Meats

Curt's Famous Meats was a meat market founded in 1947 by Curtis Jones and sold to Donna Pittman in 1989. With clientele from all across America, Curt's specializes in barbecue prepared with Kansas City rub. It has a long history of award-winning barbecue, having won eight times the American Royal barbecue competition, the largest in the world. It closed and was for sale as of July, 2018 after seventy years of operation.

Located on East Truman Road in the Kansas City suburb of Independence, Missouri, Curt's has been a large competitor in many local barbecue competitions. Curt's was also known for its predominantly female staff, nicknamed the Lady Meat Cutters.

Jones Bar-B-Q 
Jones Bar-B-Q is an independent barbecue joint on Kaw Drive in Kansas City, Kansas, owned by Deborah and Mary Jones.

In 2001 Doug Worgul featured Jones Bar-B-Q in the afterword of The Grand Barbecue: A Celebration of the History, Places, Personalities and Techniques of Kansas City Barbecue. Worgul said the sisters' barbecue "represent[ed] an artisan approach that cannot be replicated in higher-volume barbecue restaurants" and calls the location, a former taco stand, "the jointiest joint I've ever seen." In 2016 Ardie Davis called it "old school", saying the barbecue is straightforward, not oversmoked, and not overtrimmed.

As of 2016 the Kansas City Star considered them possibly the only Kansas City barbecue owned and operated by women pitmasters. The sisters do not participate in the barbecue competition circuit.

In 2018 they appeared on an episode of Steve Harvey's Steve in a segment titled "The Queens of Barbecue."

In March 2019 the sisters and the barbecue were featured on the third season of American television series Queer Eye, which was filmed in and near Kansas City. Both they and the restaurant received a makeover, and they started bottling their sauce. In the aftermath they had to put in a second barbecue pit to handle demand.

In 2019 Jones Bar-B-Q's Coconut Pineapple sauce was named by Bloomberg News as one of their five favorite barbecue sauces.

See also

 Bacon Explosion
 Burnt ends
 List of regional dishes of the United States
 List of smoked foods
 Regional variations of barbecue
 St. Louis-style barbecue

References

External links
 Kansas City barbecue restaurants
 KC Library History of Gates
 Kansas City Library Barbecue history resources
 Kansas City Barbeque Society
 American Royal BBQ Contest Information and Contest Results

American cuisine
Barbecue
Cuisine of the Midwestern United States
Culture of Kansas City, Missouri
Smoked meat